Gatewood is a neighborhood in West Seattle, Seattle, Washington.  Situated on the highest hill in Seattle it overlooks Puget Sound, the Olympic Mountains, and downtown Seattle.   It is generally bounded to the north and south by Raymond and Thistle Streets respectively, to the east by 35th Avenue, and the west by California Avenue and Fauntleroy Way. The neighborhood's landmarks include the Gatewood School, currently an elementary school.  It is minutes from Lincoln Park.

Schools
The public schools in the neighborhood are part of the Seattle Public Schools district. Gatewood Elementary is the third-oldest school in West Seattle. The original building was closed for construction in 1989, and reopened two years later.

Demographics

As of 2008–2009, the population was 5,865 people over 1.127 square miles, with the median household income being $77,693.

References

External links
Seattle City Clerk's Neighborhood Map Atlas — Gatewood

West Seattle, Seattle